These are lists of investigational drugs:

 List of investigational analgesics
 List of investigational antidepressants
 List of investigational antipsychotics
 List of investigational anxiolytics
 List of investigational attention deficit hyperactivity disorder drugs
 List of investigational hallucinogens and entactogens
 List of investigational obsessive–compulsive disorder drugs
 List of investigational sex-hormonal agents
 List of investigational sexual dysfunction drugs
 List of investigational sleep drugs

Drug-related lists
Experimental drugs